Jo Morse (born 1932) is an American bridge player from Tucson, Arizona.

Bridge accomplishments

Wins

 North American Bridge Championships (10)
 Whitehead Women's Pairs (1) 1983 
 Nail Life Master Open Pairs (1) 2003 
 Machlin Women's Swiss Teams (2) 1991, 1998 
 Wagar Women's Knockout Teams (5) 1973, 1977, 1979, 1981, 1986 
 Sternberg Women's Board-a-Match Teams (1) 1990

Runners-up

 North American Bridge Championships
 Machlin Women's Swiss Teams (1) 1985 
 Wagar Women's Knockout Teams (4) 1980, 1988, 1989, 1991 
 Sternberg Women's Board-a-Match Teams (1) 1999 
 Chicago Mixed Board-a-Match (2) 1973, 2008

Notes

Living people
American contract bridge players
1932 births
Place of birth missing (living people)
Date of birth missing (living people)
Sportspeople from Tucson, Arizona